Ignác Irhás (born 18 March 1985 in Miskolc) is a Hungarian football player who currently plays for Mezőkövesd-Zsóry SE .

References 
Haladas FC
Illes Academia
HLSZ

1985 births
Living people
Sportspeople from Miskolc
Hungarian footballers
Association football midfielders
Bőcs KSC footballers
Szombathelyi Haladás footballers
Mezőkövesdi SE footballers
Kisvárda FC players
Nemzeti Bajnokság I players